Ortalischema is a genus of flies in the family Sepsidae.

Species
Ortalischema albitarse (Zetterstedt, 1847)
Ortalischema maritimum Ozerov, 1985

References

Sepsidae
Diptera of Asia
Diptera of Europe
Brachycera genera